Vladislav Borisovich Kosarev (born 16 November 1937) is a Kazakhstani politician who served as a member of the Mäjilis, First Secretary and then Honorary Secretary of the Communist People's Party of Kazakhstan (QKHP) from 2004 to 2020 and the parliamentary leader of the QKHP from 2012 to 2018.

Biography

Early life
Kosarev was born in the town of Volodarskoye in the North Kazakhstan Region of the Kazakh SSR. He worked as a tractor driver on the Borovsk State Farm in the Rusayevsk District and then served in the Soviet Army from 1956 to 1959. He graduated from the Omsk Agricultural Institute in 1968.

Political career
In 1958, Kosarev joined the Communist Party of the Soviet Union and in 1959, he began working as the secretary of the Borovsk state farm's Komsomol (Communist Youth League) and two years later became the secretary of the Party Committee at the Michurinskiy, Volodarskiy, and Chervonnyy state farms. In 1968, he became an instructor at the Oblast Committee. He became the first secretary of the Kokshetau Oblast Komsomol in 1970 and in 1973, the First Secretary of the Leninsky Regional Party Committee. In 1974, Kosarev became the First Secretary of the Lenin District Committee of the party from the Kokchetau Region. From 1980 to 1990, he was the chairman of the Regional Committee of the Agricultural Workers Union and then became a chairman of the Kokshetau Oblast Council of Labor Unions until 1997. From 1998 to 1999, Kosarev was the Director of the Representative Office of the Kazakh National Corporation of Health and Medical Insurance "Interteach" in Kokshetau.

In 1999, he became the member of the Mäjilis from the 1st District of Akmola Region until 2004.

In 2004, after splitting from the Communist Party of Kazakhstan, together with T. A. Kenzhin and A. A. Kholodkov, Kosarev founded the Communist People's Party of Kazakhstan (QKHP) and was the First Secretary of the Central Committee until he resigned from his post on 1 June 2013. That same day, he was unanimously chosen to be the Honorary Secretary of the QKHP.

In the 2012 legislative elections, he was elected as the member of the Mäjilis, representing QKHP and was the party's parliamentary leader from 20 January 2012 until 17 September 2018, when he was succeeded by Aiqyn Qongyrov.

In 2015, Kosarev openly defended the ban on the Communist Party of Kazakhstan, claiming it was due to ignorance of the party leaders about the law.

On 11 November 2020, he voted against the renaming of the party but supported Qongyrov's candidacy as the leader of the party.

References

1937 births
Living people
People from North Kazakhstan Region
Communist Party of Kazakhstan politicians
Communist Party of the Soviet Union members
Members of the Mazhilis
Omsk State Agrarian University alumni
Recipients of the Order of Kurmet
Recipients of the Order of Parasat
Recipients of the Order of the Red Banner of Labour